Andrei Olegovich Tekuchyov (born 5 July 1999) is a Russian football player.

Club career
He made his debut in the Russian Professional Football League for FC Krasnodar-2 on 26 March 2017 in a game against FC Dynamo Stavropol. He made his Russian Football National League debut for Krasnodar-2 on 23 September 2018 in a game against FC Fakel Voronezh.

On 19 June 2019, he joined FC Chayka Peschanokopskoye on loan.

References

External links
 

1999 births
People from Nevinnomyssk
Sportspeople from Stavropol Krai
Living people
Russian footballers
Association football midfielders
FC Krasnodar players
FC Tom Tomsk players
FC Shinnik Yaroslavl players
FC Chayka Peschanokopskoye players
FC Krasnodar-2 players
FC Mashuk-KMV Pyatigorsk players